The Harbourfront Landmark is a 70-floor 233 meters tall luxury residential skyscraper completed in 2001 located in Hung Hom in the Kowloon Peninsula, Hong Kong. This prime waterfront residence has glass curtain walls and sweeping views of the Victoria Harbour, it consists 324 residential units with penthouse apartments on the top floors.

See also
 Hung Hom Ferry Pier
 List of tallest buildings in Hong Kong

External links
Emporis.com – The Harbourfront Landmark
SkycraperPage.com – The Harbourfront Landmark

Buildings and structures completed in 2001
Residential skyscrapers in Hong Kong